Jean-Paul Rappeneau (born 8 April 1932) is a French film director and screenwriter.

Career
He started out in film as an assistant and screenwriter collaborating with Louis Malle on  Zazie dans le métro in 1960 and Vie privée in 1961. In 1964, he was co-screenwriter for L'Homme de Rio, which starred Jean-Paul Belmondo.

The first film that he both wrote and directed was A Matter of Resistance in 1965. Although it was a great critical and popular success, he did not make another film until 1971, when he directed Les Mariés de l'an II, again starring Belmondo and Marlène Jobert.

In 1990, Rappeneau directed a deluxe Technicolor film version of Cyrano de Bergerac, his adaptation of the classic French play by Edmond Rostand, starring Gérard Depardieu. Rappeneau's film version is the most elaborate film version of the play ever made, and one of the most expensive French films ever produced. It is the only rendition of the play in the original French to be released widely. At the 1991 César Awards, Rappeneau won the César Award for Best Director and César Award for Best Film.

The 2003 comedy Bon voyage, co-written with Patrick Modiano, again starred Depardieu, this time with Isabelle Adjani. The film was nominated 11 times at the 2004 César Awards.

Filmography

References

External links
 

1932 births
Living people
People from Auxerre
French film directors
French male screenwriters
French screenwriters
Best Director César Award winners